The Indiana County Transit Authority, doing business as IndiGO, is a public transportation system, serving the Indiana County Area of Pennsylvania.

Fleet
 7 - 29’ Gillig Low Floor
 3 - 35’ Gillig Low Floor
 5 - 40’ Gillig Low Floor Commuter Coaches
 21 - Ford

Routes (as of June 2021)
 1 - Oakland Avenue
 2 - West Pike Road
 3 - Hospital/119 Professional
 5 - North 4th Street
 6 - Blairsville
 7 - Plumville/Smicksburg
 8 - Combined Routes 2 and 3
 12 - IUP Shopper (IUP Campus to Malls and Wal-Mart via IRMC) [Daily]

IUP Only Routes
These routes operate during IUP Fall and Spring semesters only.

 4 - Campus Loop 
 20 IUP Park-N-Ride

References

External links 
Indiana County Transit Authority website

Transportation in Indiana County, Pennsylvania
Bus transportation in Pennsylvania
Indiana, Pennsylvania
Municipal authorities in Pennsylvania
Organizations established in 1979